Salvatore Amitrano (born 3 December 1975 in Castellammare di Stabia, Province of Naples) is an Italian rower.

Amitrano was a member of the Italian men's lightweight rowing team that won a bronze medal at the 2004 Summer Olympics in Athens.

When not competing, he works for the State Police in Italy.

References
 sports-reference

1975 births
Living people
People from Castellammare di Stabia
Olympic bronze medalists for Italy
Rowers at the 2000 Summer Olympics
Rowers at the 2004 Summer Olympics
Rowers at the 2008 Summer Olympics
Italian male rowers
Olympic rowers of Italy
Olympic medalists in rowing
Medalists at the 2004 Summer Olympics
Mediterranean Games silver medalists for Italy
Competitors at the 2005 Mediterranean Games
World Rowing Championships medalists for Italy
Mediterranean Games medalists in rowing
Rowers of Fiamme Oro
European Rowing Championships medalists
Sportspeople from the Province of Naples